Azam Khan was a Subahdar of Bengal. He served as Subahdar of Bengal from 1632 to 1635. He was also known as Iradat Khan.

Azam Khan's real name was Mir Muhammad Baqir. He was originally from Iraq and came to Indian subcontinent during the reign of Jahangir. Jahangir appointed him as "Khan-i-Saman". Then, he was appointed as Subahdar of Kashmir. Later, he was appointed as Mir Bakhxi too. Shahjahan honoured him with the title "Azam Khan" and he appointed him as "Chief Wazir".

When Azan Khan was the ruler of Bengal, the English had warm relation with the authority. During his ruling time Bengal faced chaotic administrative and military situation because, Assamese King Pratap Singh made sporadic raids in Kamarupa. For this, he was removed from his post and Islam Khan II was appointed as Subahdar of Bengal.

References

Subahdars of Bengal
Subahdars of Kashmir